Bob Bryan and Mike Bryan were the defending champions and successfully defended their title, defeating Vasek Pospisil and Jack Sock in the final, 6–3, 1–6, [10–8].

Seeds

Draw

Finals

Top half

Bottom half

References
 Main Draw

Men's Doubles
Men in Florida